Wojnarowice  is a village in the administrative district of Gmina Sobótka, within Wrocław County, Lower Silesian Voivodeship, in south-western Poland.

Notable residents
 Gebhardt von Moltke (1938 – 2019), German diplomat

References

Wojnarowice